Rhytirhynchia is a genus of brachiopods belonging to the family Basiliolidae.

Species:
Rhytirhynchia hataiana 
Rhytirhynchia sladeni

References

Brachiopod genera